Seth Williams (born October 24, 1986) is an American football defensive back who is currently a free agent. Williams played college football at the University of Richmond. The Richmond Spiders won the NCAA Division I FCS championship in 2008. He has been a member of the New York Giants, Ottawa Redblacks, Montreal Alouettes, New Orleans VooDoo and Tampa Bay Storm.

Professional career

New York Giants
Williams was signed by the New York Giants on April 26, 2010. He was waived by the Giants on September 4, 2010 and signed to their practice squad on September 5.
Williams was released by the New York Giants on September 9, 2010.

Montreal Alouettes
Williams signed with the Montreal Alouettes on January 20, 2011. He recorded 98 tackles from 2011 to 2012. He was signed to a two-year deal by the Alouettes on February 14, 2013. He was the Alouettes Most Outstanding Rookie in 2011.

He was released by the Alouettes on June 21, 2013.

Williams missed the entire 2013 season while recovering form an ankle injury.

Ottawa Redblacks
Williams was signed by the Ottawa Redblacks on March 4, 2014. He was released by the Redblacks on August 18, 2014.

New Orleans VooDoo
William was assigned to the New Orleans VooDoo of the Arena Football League (AFL) on March 6, 2015. He became a free agent after the 2015 season.

Tampa Bay Storm
On March 1, 2016, Williams was assigned to the Tampa Bay Storm. On April 7, 2016, Williams was placed on reassignment.
On May 4, 2016, Williams was assigned to the Storm again.

References

External links
Just Sports Stats
NFL Draft Scout

Living people
1986 births
American football cornerbacks
Canadian football defensive backs
African-American players of American football
African-American players of Canadian football
Richmond Spiders football players
Montreal Alouettes players
Ottawa Redblacks players
New Orleans VooDoo players
Tampa Bay Storm players
Players of American football from North Carolina
Sportspeople from Fayetteville, North Carolina
21st-century African-American sportspeople
20th-century African-American people